Luboš Bartoň (born 7 April 1980) is a Czech professional basketball coach. He is a 2.02 m tall small forward who last played for FC Barcelona B of Spain's second division.

College career
Bartoň played college basketball at Valparaiso University with the Valparaiso Crusaders from 1998 to 1902.

Pro career
Bartoň grew up with the SCE Decin youth team. He made his pro debut with SCE Decin during the 1996–97 season.  He moved to Italy for the 2002–03 season, signed by Fortitudo Bologna. Then he was signed for the 2003–04 season by Virtus Roma.

He moved to Spain for the 2005–06 season, signed by Joventut Badalona. After three seasons with Badalona, he moved to FC Barcelona in 2008. In August 2010 he then moved to Baloncesto Fuenlabrada, signing a two-year deal.

On 3 October 2016, Bartoň retired from professional basketball and decided to start a new career as coach.

On 13 July 2022, Bartoň is the assistant coach of Girona Basketball for the 2022–23 season.

Czech Republic national team
Bartoň has been a member of both the junior and senior Czech Republic national basketball teams. At the EuroBasket 1999, he was the second best scorer of the tournament, averaging 18.7 points per game.

Awards and achievements
Played at the 1998 Czech All Star Game
Named the 1998-99 MCC Newcomer of the Year
Named to the 2000-01 All-MCC 2nd Team
Named the 2001-02 MCC Player of the Year
Named to the 2001-02 All-MCC 1st Team
Won the 2006 FIBA EuroCup with Joventut Badalona

References

External links
NBA.com Profile
Euroleague.net Profile
Spanish League Profile 
Luboš Bartoň Valparaiso Crusaders Game Log (2001-02)
idnes.cz

1980 births
Living people
Baloncesto Fuenlabrada players
Basketball Löwen Braunschweig players
BK Děčín players
Basketball Nymburk players
Czech expatriate basketball people in Germany
Czech expatriate basketball people in Italy
Czech expatriate basketball people in Spain
Czech expatriate basketball people in the United States
Czech men's basketball players
FC Barcelona Bàsquet players
FC Barcelona Bàsquet B players
Fortitudo Pallacanestro Bologna players
Joventut Badalona players
Liga ACB players
Pallacanestro Virtus Roma players
People from Česká Lípa
Shooting guards
Small forwards
USK Praha players
Valencia Basket players
Valparaiso Beacons men's basketball players
Sportspeople from the Liberec Region